The non-protein amino acid-accumulating clade, also known as the Canavanine-accumulating clade is a clade of the flowering plant subfamily Faboideae (or Papilionoideae) that includes the majority of agriculturally-cultivated legumes. It is characterized by the accumulation of the non-proteinogenic amino acid canavanine in the seeds—a deterrent against herbivory. This phylogenetic trait was first recognized in the early 1980s. This clade is consistently resolved in molecular phylogenies. It contains many economically important genera, including Cicer, Glycine, Medicago, Phaseolus, Trifolium, Vicia, and Vigna.

Description
This clade circumscribes five subordinate clades: two traditional tribes (Hypocalypteae and Indigofereae) and three informal clades (the mirbelioids, the millettioids, and Hologalegina), as well as several minor taxa. The name of this clade is informal and is not assumed to have any particular taxonomic rank like the names authorized by the ICBN or the ICPN. The clade does not currently have a node-based definition.

References

Non-protein amino acid-accumulating clade
Plant unranked clades